Ceroplesis orientalis is a species of beetle in the family Cerambycidae. It was described by Herbst in 1786. It is known from the Democratic Republic of the Congo, Angola, Cameroon, Malawi, Kenya, Gabon, Mozambique, Sierra Leone, Namibia, Somalia, Tanzania, South Africa, Zimbabwe, and Togo. It feeds on Acacia decurrens and Acacia abyssinica.

Varietas
 Ceroplesis orientalis var. latevittata Fairmaire, 1891
 Ceroplesis orientalis var. leonensis Hintz, 1919

References

orientalis
Beetles described in 1786